Perrytown is a town in Hempstead County, Arkansas, United States. The population was 272 at the 2010 census. It is part of the Hope Micropolitan Statistical Area and was founded in 1959 by local entrepreneur Perry Campbell.

Geography
Perrytown is located at  (33.698694, -93.535194).

Demographics

As of the census of 2000, there were 255 people, 119 households, and 82 families residing in the city. The racial makeup of the city was 87.45% White, 9.02% Black or African American, 0.39% Native American, 3.14% from other races.  4.31% of the population were Hispanic or Latino of any race.

There were 119 households, out of which 19.3% had children under the age of 18 living with them, 58.8% were married couples living together, 7.6% had a female householder with no husband present, and 30.3% were non-families. 26.9% of all households were made up of individuals, and 8.4% had someone living alone who was 65 years of age or older.  The average household size was 2.14 and the average family size was 2.54.

In the city the population was spread out, with 16.9% under the age of 18, 9.8% from 18 to 24, 21.6% from 25 to 44, 34.1% from 45 to 64, and 17.6% who were 65 years of age or older.  The median age was 46 years. For every 100 females, there were 83.5 males.  For every 100 females age 18 and over, there were 86.0 males.

The median income for a household in the city was $30,625, and the median income for a family was $38,438. Males had a median income of $31,250 versus $16,786 for females. The per capita income for the city was $23,059.  About 11.5% of families and 10.5% of the population were below the poverty line, including 7.7% of those under the age of eighteen and 3.4% of those 65 or over.

Education
It is within the Hope School District. It operates Hope High School.

References

Towns in Hempstead County, Arkansas
Towns in Arkansas
Hope micropolitan area